Rosehill railway station is a disused railway station in Sydney, Australia that is located next to Rosehill Gardens Racecourse. It was open between 1888 and 2020. It served passengers on the Sandown railway line until 1991, the Carlingford line until 2020, and special event services to the racecourse, as well as serving the local suburb of Rosehill.

History
Rosehill station opened on 17 November 1888. The station was relocated on 14 May 1959.

It lies at the end of a double track section from the Main Western line junction at Clyde. The station has two platforms, a four car platform on the Carlingford branch, and a 16 car platform on the Sandown line, which was used by Rosehill Gardens Racecourse trains on selected racedays. Immediately south of platform 2 is a protected tree with a dilapidated fence around it.

Closure
The majority of the Carlingford railway line is being converted to light rail as part of the Parramatta Light Rail project. The Carlingford line including Rosehill station closed on 5 January 2020 and the Sandown line closed in July 2019, to enable light rail construction to proceed.

Platforms & former services
At the time the station closed the platforms had the following services:

Transport links
Transdev NSW operates one route via Rosehill station:
M92: Parramatta station to Sutherland station

Rosehill station was served by one NightRide route:
N61: Carlingford station to City (Town Hall)

Trackplan

References

External links

Rosehill station details Transport for NSW

Disused railway stations in Sydney
Railway stations in Australia opened in 1888
Railway stations closed in 2020
2020 disestablishments in Australia
City of Parramatta